Deal It Out is Tom Fogerty's fifth and final solo album, though he would release one album, Precious Gems, as "Tom Fogerty + Ruby" and record an album with Randy Oda, Sidekicks, that was released posthumously.

Track listing
All songs written by Tom Fogerty, except where noted.
 "Champagne Love" – 2:47 (Doug Clifford, Tom Fogerty)
 "Why Me" – 5:39
 "Real Real Gone" – 4:06 (Van Morrison)
 "Tricia Suzanne" – 2:55
 "Mystery Train" – 2:31  (Junior Parker, Sam Phillips)
 "Deal It Out" – 3:13  (Hans Olson)
 "Open the Windows" – 3:17  (Kim Park)
 "You Move Me" – 4:25 (Van Morrison)
 "The Secret" – 2:26
 "Summer Night" – 4:08  (Kim Park)

Personnel
 Tom Fogerty - guitar, harmonica, vocals
 Bill Swartz - guitar
 John Blakeley - guitar
 Greg Douglass - guitar
 John Allair - keyboards
 Mark Isham - keyboards
 Marc Russo - keyboards
 Pee Wee Ellis - saxophone
 Tom Lilienthal - bass
 David Hayes - bass
 Scott Morris - drums
 Jeff Myer - drums

References

External links

Tom Fogerty albums
1981 albums
Fantasy Records albums